Lewis Cass High School is a high school located in Walton, Indiana, United States. It is a part of Lewis Cass Schools.  It was formerly named Lewis Cass Jr./Sr. High School before a reorganization of Thompson Elementary, Galveston Elementary, and the middle school resulted in all schools in the corporation bearing the Lewis Cass name.

Athletics

Lewis Cass athletic teams compete in the Hoosier Athletic Conference, following the disbanding of the Mid-Indiana Conference in 2015.

See also
 List of high schools in Indiana

References

External links
Lewis Cass High School

Public high schools in Indiana
Schools in Cass County, Indiana
Buildings and structures in Cass County, Indiana